Russia has competed at the modern Olympic Games on many occasions, but as different nations in its history. As the Russian Empire, the nation first competed at the 1900 Games, and returned again in 1908 and 1912. 

In the Grand Duchy of Finland, which was an autonomous part of the Russian Empire until 1917, a separate National Olympic Committee was created in 1907. Finland's own team thus participated already in the Olympic Games of 1908 and 1912. 

After the Russian revolution in 1917, and the subsequent establishment of the Soviet Union in 1922, it would be forty years until Russian athletes again competed at the Olympics, as the Soviet Union at the 1952 Summer Olympics.  After the dissolution of the Soviet Union in 1991, the new country of the Russian Federation competed as part of the Unified Team in 1992, and finally returned again as Russia for the 1994 Winter Olympics.

Medal tables

Medals by Summer Games

Medals by summer sport 

This table does not include the gold medal won in Figure skating at the 1908 Summer Olympics.

Medals by winter sport 

This table includes the gold medal won in Figure skating at the 1908 Summer Olympics.

Summary by sport

Equestrian

The Russian Empire competed in equestrian at the first Games in which the sport was held, in Paris 1900. Two riders competed in all five of the events, winning no medals.

Jumping

Driving

Fencing

The Russian Empire's 1900 Olympic debut included two fencers in the men's masters sabre event; they placed 5th and 7th.

See also
 List of flag bearers for Russia at the Olympics
 :Category:Olympic competitors for Russia

External links
 
 
 
  (London 1908)
  (Stockholm 1912)

+
Olympics